Aristolochia amara is a species of plant in the family Aristolochiaceae.

References

amara
Plants described in 1775
Taxa named by Jean Baptiste Christian Fusée-Aublet